Self-organized time-division multiple access (STDMA) is a channel access method designed by Håkan Lans, based on time-division multiplexing.

The term "self-organized" describes the manner in which time slots are assigned to users. Time-division multiple access (TDMA) divides a channel into frames, which furthermore are subdivided into a vast number of time slots. Users transmit in rapid succession, one after the other, each using their own time slot. One of the drawbacks of TDMA is that it requires a central station for slot assignment and time synchronisation. STDMA proposes  for assigning slots without the involvement of a central station. Time synchronisation is usually taken care of using Coordinated Universal Time (UTC).

STDMA is in use by the Automatic Identification System (AIS), a standard marine short-range coastal tracking system, and is the base of the International Civil Aviation Organization VHF Data Link Mode 4.

While the method was patented, a US patent ex-parte reexamination certificate was issued in 2010 canceling all claims.

References

External links 
 Håkan Lans, designer of STDMA (DMOZ entry)
 GP&C Systems International AB Holding company of STDMA patent rights in Europe

Maritime communication